Emile Boustany (1909–2002) was a Lebanese military general who served as the Commander of the Lebanese Armed Forces from 1 July 1965 until 6 January 1970.

Biography 
Boustany was born in Jounieh to a poor Lebanese family. He served as a commander with the rank of general in the Lebanese Armed Forces from 1 July 1965 to 6 January 1970.

Boustany went to Egypt in 1969 and drafted the Cairo Accord, which was the first official concession of sovereignty of the Lebanese state. It is said that Egyptian President Nasser was pleasantly surprised to see the degree of concession offered to him - at the time Egypt had a strong say in electing the Lebanese president. 

In 1973, he was named the primary suspect in a bribery scandal within the Lebanese Army related to arms transactions. He fled to Syria where he was granted asylum by Hafez al-Assad. From Syria, he helped to subvert Saeb Salam's government.

Boustany's daughter, Loubna, married Jean Obeid.

Awards and honors
 Lebanese Silver Order of Merit
 Syrian Order of Merit in 2nd grade
 Commemorative Medal of Palestine
 National Order of the Cedar in grade of Knight
 Order of the Phoenix in rank of Commandor
 War Medal in Silver Star
 Lebanese Golden Medal of Merit
 National Order of the Cedar in Officer Grade
 American Legion of Merit
 Order of the Throne of Marrakech in grade of grand officer
 Medal of the Eagle for aviation in excellent class
 Golden Commemorative Medal of his Holiness Pope Leon XIII of the Latin Patriarchate of Jerusalem
 Lebanese Order of Merit, order of Commandor
 Commemorative Medal
 Medal of Competence from the Minister of the Interior
 Brazilian National Order of Merit in grade of grand officer
 Haitian National Order of Honor and Merit in grade of Grand Cordon
 Senegalese National Order in grade of grand officer
 Ethiopian Grand Cordon
 Grand Cordons of the Order of Independence (Jordan)
 National Order of the Cedar in grade of grand officer
 Military Medal
 Felicitations of the Prime Minister
 Commendation for the troop
 Felicitations of the Commander of the Mount Lebanon region

References

External links
 

Lebanese military personnel
1909 births
2002 deaths
Air force generals

Grand Officers of the National Order of the Cedar
Recipients of the Order of Merit (Lebanon)

Grand Cordons of the Order of Independence (Jordan)
Commanders of the Order of the Phoenix (Greece)
People from Jounieh
Lebanese Maronites